The 1947 Kentucky State Thorobreds football team was an American football team that represented Kentucky State Industrial College (now known as Kentucky State University) as a member of the Midwest Athletic Association (MAA) during the 1947 college football season. In its first season under head coach C. Randy Taylor, the team compiled a 4–6 record (3–3 against conference opponents) and outscored all opponents by a total of 174 to 112. The team was ranked No. 22 among the nation's black college football teams according to the Pittsburgh Courier and its Dickinson Rating System. The team played its home games at Alumni Field in Frankfort, Kentucky.

Schedule

References

Kentucky State
Kentucky State Thorobreds football seasons
Kentucky State Thorobreds football